Detours is the second and final studio album by Australian pop singer Christie Allen, released in November 1980. The album peaked at No.96 on the Australian charts.

Track listing

Charts

References 

1980 albums
Mushroom Records albums
Christie Allen albums